The 2015 Tour of Belgium (known as the 2015 Baloise Belgium Tour for sponsorship purposes) was the 85th edition of the Tour of Belgium cycling stage race. It took place from 27 to 31 May 2015 in Belgium, and was part of the 2015 UCI Europe Tour.

Schedule

Teams
20 teams were invited to the 2015 Tour of Belgium: 8 UCI WorldTeams, 6 UCI Professional Continental teams and 6 UCI Continental teams.

Stages

Prologue
27 May 2015 – Bornem to Bornem,

Stage 1
28 May 2015 – Lochristi to Knokke-Heist,

Stage 2
29 May 2015 – Knokke-Heist to Herzele,

Stage 3
30 May 2015 – Eau d'Heure lakes to Eau d'Heure lakes,

Stage 4
31 May 2015 – St. Vith to St. Vith,

Classification leadership table

References

External links

Tour of Belgium
Tour of Belgium
Tour of Belgium